Panepirotikos Athlitikos Syllogos Giannina (Greek: Πανηπειρωτικός Αθλητικός Σύλλογος Γιάννινα, Panepirotic Athletic Club Giannina) is a Greek multi-sport club based in the city of Ioannina, capital of Greece's Epirus region.

PAS Giannina was formed in 8 July 1966 as a result of the union of the two local teams – AO Ioanninon (union of Atromitos Ioanninon and Olympiacos Ioanninon in 1962) and PAS Averof. Its colors are blue and white. A bull was chosen as the emblem of the new team, as it appeared on the ancient coin of the Epirote League.

Departments 

 PAS Giannina FC - Football
 PAS Giannina BC
 PAS Giannina women's basketball
PAS Giannina women's volleyball
 Swimming
 Finswimming
 Fencing

Sport facilities 
The football team plays in Zosimades stadium in Ioannina. The basketball teams play in the Eanki indoor arena until 2018. From this year, the teams will use the new indoor arena. The volleyball team play in the Eanki indoor arena. The swimming and finswimming team play in the natatorium of Eanki. The fencing team used training facilities in Kepavi. The team uses new training facilities from October 2019.

References

External links 
Official site

Multi-sport clubs in Greece
Ioannina
1966 establishments in Greece
Sports clubs in Epirus